Chrysocoris iris is a species of shield-backed bugs belonging to the family Scutelleridae.

Description
These shield-backed bugs are purplish-red with bluish reflections and black spots.

Distribution
This species is present in India and Indonesia.

References

Scutelleridae
Hemiptera of Asia
Insects described in 1839
Insects of Asia